The 2010–11 season is PAS Giannina F.C.'s 26th competitive season in the second division of Greek football and 45th year in existence as a football club. They also compete in the Greek Cup.

Players 
Updated:-

International players

Foreign players

Personnel

Management

Coaching staff

Medical staff

Academy

Transfers

Summer

In

Out

Winter

In

Out

Pre-season and friendlies

Competitions

Football League (Greece)

League table

Results summary

Fixtures

Greek cup

Second round

Fourth round

Fifth round

Statistics

Appearances

Goalscorers

Clean sheets

Disciplinary record

Awards 
Top Scorer of Beta Ethniki:Ibrahima Bakayoko (19 goals)

Source: Soccerway

References

External links 

 Official Website

PAS Giannina F.C. seasons
Greek football clubs 2010–11 season